John Raymond Scott (born July 12, 1938) is an American former professional basketball player and coach.

Playing career
A 6'9" forward/center who played college basketball at the University of Portland, Scott was selected with the fourth pick of the 1961 NBA Draft by the Detroit Pistons, and was a deadly shooter near the perimeter of the court. Scott had an 11-year career in the National Basketball Association (NBA) and the American Basketball Association (ABA), with the Pistons, Baltimore Bullets, and Virginia Squires.

Coaching career
Scott was promoted from assistant to head coach of the Pistons on October 28, 1972, succeeding Earl Lloyd after a 2–5 start. Under his direction, the ballclub went 38–37 for the remainder of the 1972–73 campaign. He received the NBA Coach of the Year Award and become the first black man to win NBA coach of the year after guiding the Pistons to a then-franchise-best 52–30 regular season record in 1973–74. The team slumped to 40–42 in 1974–75. He was dismissed and replaced by assistant Herb Brown with the Pistons at 17–25 on January 26, 1976. He was appointed men's basketball head coach at Eastern Michigan University just over six weeks later on March 10, 1976. Over three seasons, he guided EMU to a 29–52 record. Eastern Michigan fired Scott in March 1979.

Personal
After his coaching career, Scott went into private business. He  also has held the position of ambassador for children and families for the Wellspring Lutheran service agency in Michigan.  In February 2008, Scott was inducted into the Michigan Sports Hall of Fame.  In April 2008, during a celebration of the Pistons' 50th anniversary, he was named one of the "30 All-Time Pistons".  In November 2017, Scott was inducted into the Philadelphia Sports Hall of Fame.

References

1938 births
Living people
Allentown Jets players
American men's basketball players
Baltimore Bullets (1963–1973) players
Basketball coaches from Pennsylvania
Buffalo Braves expansion draft picks
Centers (basketball)
Detroit Pistons draft picks
Detroit Pistons head coaches
Detroit Pistons players
Eastern Michigan Eagles men's basketball coaches
Portland Pilots men's basketball players
Power forwards (basketball)
Virginia Squires players
Basketball players from Philadelphia
Sportspeople from Philadelphia
West Philadelphia High School alumni